The Central Anatolian steppe  is a Palearctic ecoregion in the temperate grasslands, savannas, and shrublands biome. It covers an area of 24,934 km2.

Geography
The Central Anatolian steppe is located in the Central Anatolia region of Turkey, where it occupies the lowest portion of the Central Anatolian plain. It consists of three separate areas, along with several smaller ones.

The largest is centered on Lake Tuz, and also includes the middle reach of the Kizilirmak River. The second area is the Karapınar and Konya Plains south of Lake Tuz. The Obruk Plateau separates the Lake Tuz basin from the Karapınar and Konya plains. The third area lies in the middle valleys of the Sakarya and Porsuk rivers northwest of Lake Tuz, as they curve around the eastern end of the Sündiken Mountains.

The ecoregion consists mostly of plains and river valleys, with an average elevation of 1,000 m. Mountains and plateaus define the edges of the ecoregion.

Lake Tuz lies in a closed basin, fed by seasonal streams descending from the surrounding plateaus. The average elevation of the lake is 829 m. In the summer months, the lake mostly dries up, exposing salt flats. During the winter months the lake refills and expands.

The steppe is mostly bounded by the Central Anatolian deciduous forests ecoregion, which occupies the plateaus and mountains of Central Anatolia. The Sündiken Mountains are part of the Anatolian conifer and deciduous mixed forests ecoregion. The Northern Anatolian conifer and deciduous forests ecoregion covers the Pontic Mountains, which enclose Central Anatolia on the north.

Climate
The ecoregion has a continental climate, with hot and dry summers and cold winters. The ecoregion is semi-arid, and annual precipitation ranges from 400 to 500 mm, and as low as 300 mm in some rain shadow areas.

Flora
Lake Tuz is surrounded by salt steppe, composed of salt-tolerant (halophytic) low shrubs and herbaceous plants, including many from the Chenopodiaceae and Plumbaginaceae families. The most salt-tolerant plants grow closest to the center of the lake, with less salt-tolerant plants occupying higher areas. Lake Tuz' saline steppes are home to many endemic species.

The Karapınar Plain includes areas of salt steppe around smaller saline lakes, seasonal freshwater wetlands, and upland steppes characterized by Limonium anatolicum, with Petrosimonia brachiata, Alhagi pseudoalhagi, Salsola crassa, Petrosimonia nigeensis, and Frankenia hirsuta.

Fauna
The ecoregion's salt lakes and freshwater wetlands are home to large populations of water birds, including resident and breeding birds and winter migrants.

A subspecies of Asian short-toed lark (Alaudala cheleensis ssp. niethammeri), inhabits the barren fringes of the ecoregion's salt and soda lakes. Steppe bird species include the great bustard (Otis tarda) and little bustard (Tetrax tetrax).

Mammal species of the salt steppe include Williams's jerboa (Allactaga williamsi), Anatolian ground squirrel (Spermophilus xanthoprymnus), Turkish hamster (Mesocricetus brandtii), Eurasian badger (Meles meles), and marbled polecat (Vormela peregusna).

External links

References

Natural history of Anatolia
Ecoregions of Turkey
Ecoregions of Asia

Palearctic ecoregions
Temperate grasslands, savannas, and shrublands